Al-Manshiyya was a Palestinian Arab village in the Safad Subdistrict (located 30 km northeast of Safad) that was depopulated by the Palmach's First Battalion of Operation Yiftach during the 1948 War on May 24, 1948.

In 1948 it had a population of 140. 1948 was also the year the village was destroyed and depopulated. It is now mainly deserted with multiple abandoned buildings.

References

Bibliography

External links 
 Welcome To al-Manshiyya
Al-Manshiyya, Villages of Palestine
al-Manshiyya (Safed), Zochrot
Survey of Western Palestine, Map 2:   IAA, Wikimedia commons

Arab villages depopulated during the 1948 Arab–Israeli War
District of Safad